Takiyama may refer to:

Takiyama Station, a railway station in Kawanishi, Hyōgo Prefecture, Japan
Takiyama Prefectural Natural Park, a national park of Western Tokyo, Japan
Takiyama Castle (disambiguation)

People with the surname
, Japanese anime producer

See also
Takayama (disambiguation)

Japanese-language surnames